Shirapur is a village in Parner taluka in Ahmednagar district of state of Maharashtra, India.

Gramapanchayat Sarapanch 
Janatai Bhaskar Uchale

Religion 

The majority of the population in the village is Hindu.
Village is famous for Temple of Shiddheshwar and Hanuman.
Village is also famous for 'Kusti'(Wrestling). [Created by Somnath K. Ghode]

Geography and climate 
Shirapur is surrounded by Rahuri Taluka towards East, Shirur Taluka towards west, Shrigonda Taluka towards South, Sangamner Taluka towards North. The village is well connected with Aalephata, Alkuti, Jambut and Nighoj. The Taluka headquarter viz Parner, is located 27 km away and District headquarter viz Ahemadnagar is located appx 65 km away. The village is located in the rain shadow area of the Sahyadris. It has an arid climate. Irrigation from the river Kukadi and Canal  from wells serve most of the village. Crops include sugar cane, bajra, groundnuts and pomegranates.
[created by Ramesh Chate]

Demography
Hinduism (90% of the population) is the largest religion, followed by other religions such as Islam, Jainism. All the sects/religions coexist in a peaceful manner participating in each other's celebrations and functions. Major castes are dhangar and Marathas, both of whom share significant similar livelihood patterns. As both groups do farming and livestock rearing. Major families include Chate, Uchale, Ghode, Narsale, Shinare, Lokhande, Vadne, Khamkar, Khomane, Lonkar, Yede.

Economy 

The majority of the population has farming as their primary occupation.
Along with farming near about 60% population is doing dairy related work.

See also 

 Parner taluka
 Villages in Parner taluka

References 

Villages in Ahmednagar district
Villages in Parner taluka